Deulikot is a Village development committee in Bajhang District in the Seti Zone of north-western Nepal. At the time of the 1991 Nepal census it had a population of 4,698 and had 829 houses in the village.

References

Populated places in Bajhang District

Deulikot is a village as well as wad.